The Tafas Massacre refers to the slaughter of civilians in the Ottoman Syrian town of Tafas following the retreat of the Ottoman Army in an attempt to demoralize the enemy.

Background
Nearing the end of World War I in the autumn of 1918, a retreating Ottoman Army column of roughly two thousand entered Tafas. Its commander, Shereef Bey, ordered all the people massacred, including the women and children to demoralize the British and Arab forces in pursuit of the Turkish army. The British commander leading the Arab forces, T. E. Lawrence, arrived in the area shortly after the massacre and witnessed bodies mutilated and the majority of the town in ruins. In retaliation for the massacre, Lawrence's troops attacked the withdrawing Turkish columns, and for the first time in the war ordered his men to take no prisoners. Around 250 German and Austrian soldiers traveling with the Ottoman troops that had been captured that day were summarily executed as they were gunned down by Lawrence's enraged men with machine guns.

Lawrence wrote in his diary, and in Seven Pillars of Wisdom: "We left Abd el Main there and rode on past the other bodies, now seen clearly in the sunlight to be men, women, and four babies, toward the village whose loneliness we knew meant that it was full of death and horror. On the outskirts were the low mud walls of some sheep-folds, and on one lay something red and white. I looked nearer, and saw the body of a woman folded across it, face downward, nailed there by a saw-bayonet whose half stuck hideously into the air from between her naked legs. She had been pregnant, and about her were others, perhaps twenty in all, variously killed, but laid out to accord with an obscene taste. The Zaggi burst out into wild peals of laughter, in which some of those who were not sick joined hysterically. It was a sight near madness, the more desolate for the warm sunshine and the clean air of this upland afternoon. I said: "The best of you brings me the most Turkish dead"; and we turned and rode as fast as we might in the direction of the fading enemy. On our way we shot down those of them fallen out by the roadside who came imploring our pity."

See also
List of massacres in Ottoman Syria

References

Massacres in 1918
Massacres in the Ottoman Empire
World War I crimes by the Ottoman Empire
Austro-Hungarian collusion with war crimes by the Ottoman Empire
Imperial German collusion with war crimes by the Ottoman Empire
Prisoner of war massacres
World War I massacres
Ethnic cleansing in Asia
Mass murder in 1918
1918 in Ottoman Syria